Ripa Gothia is a region of the Byzantine Empire mentioned by Flavius Dalmatius.

References 

Goths

See Henry Melvill Gwatkins’ “The Cambridge Medieval  History: The Christian Roman Empire and the Foundation of the Teutonic Kingdoms”, 1911. Reference made to Ripa Gothica being ceded by Constantine to his nephew Delmatius.